Ko Koet is an island in the Chao Phraya River in the area of Bang Pa-in district, southern part of Phra Nakhon Si Ayutthaya province, central Thailand.

History
Ko Koet was formed from the Chao Phraya River that flows through it and blowing the sediment to accumulate for a long time, until it formed an island in the middle of the river. Hence the name Ko Koet, which means "formed island".

Geography
The area is plain with rivers emptying through it.

Neighbouring places are (from the north clockwise): Ban Phlap in its district, Bang Krasan in its district, and Sanam Chai in Bang Sai district, respectively.

Administration
Ko Koet is a tambon (sub-district) of Bang Pa-in district.

The tambon is administered by the Subdistrict Administrative Organization (SAO) Kho Koet (องค์การบริหารส่วนตำบลเกาะเกิด).

Economy
Most of the residents have a career in fruit farming. Tourism is one of the main sources of income here, now it has been promoted to a cultural tourism destination and learn about the way of life of the community. There are accommodations in form of homestay for visitors.

Places
Arts of Kingdom Museum
Wat Phaya Yat
Wat Choeng Tha

Local products
Thai herbal pills
Mi krop (crisp noodles)
Thai sweets

References

Tourist attractions in Phra Nakhon Si Ayutthaya province
Tambon of Phra Nakhon Si Ayutthaya Province
River islands of Thailand
Populated places on the Chao Phraya River